The United States District Court for the Central District of California (in case citations, C.D. Cal.; commonly referred to as the CDCA or CACD) is a Federal trial court that serves over 19 million people in Southern and Central California, making it the most populous federal judicial district. The district was created on September 18, 1966. Cases from the Central District are appealed to the United States Court of Appeals for the Ninth Circuit (except for patent claims and claims against the United States government under the Tucker Act, which are appealed to the Federal Circuit). Along with the Central District of Illinois, the court is the only district court referred to by the name "Central" – all other courts with similar geographical names instead use the term "Middle."

History 

California was admitted to the union on September 9, 1850, and was divided into two federal trial court districts - Northern and Southern - by Act of Congress on September 28, 1850, 9 Stat. 521. The boundary was at the 37th parallel. The two districts were merged as the United States District Court for the District of California on July 27, 1866 by 14 Stat. 300. On August 5, 1886, Congress re-created the Southern District by 24 Stat. 308, while the northern half was renamed Northern District. The Eastern and Central Districts of California were created on March 18, 1966 from portions of the Northern and Southern Districts by 80 Stat. 75.

Divisions 

The U.S. District Court for the Central District of California is divided into three divisions, with jurisdiction over seven counties: Riverside, San Bernardino, Orange, Los Angeles, San Luis Obispo, Santa Barbara, and Ventura.

The Eastern Division covers Riverside and San Bernardino Counties at the Riverside courthouse.

The Southern Division covers Orange County from the Ronald Reagan Federal Building and Courthouse in Santa Ana.

The Western Division covers Los Angeles, San Luis Obispo, Santa Barbara, and Ventura Counties. Cases are heard in two courthouses in downtown Los Angeles. All but two district judges are located in the new First Street Courthouse, whereas magistrate judges and two district judges maintain chambers in the Edward R. Roybal Courthouse.

United States attorney for the Central District of California 

The United States attorney for the Central District of California represents the United States Government in civil and criminal cases before the court. , the United States attorney is E. Martin Estrada.

Current judges 
:

Vacancies and pending nominations

Former judges

Chief judges

Succession of seats

List of U.S. Attorneys
George J. Denis (1888–1889)
Aurelus H. Hutton (1889–1890)
Matthew T. Allen (1892–1893)
George J. Denis (1893–1897)
Frank P. Flint	(1897–1901)
Louis H. Valentine (1901–1905)
Oscar Lawler (1905–1909)
Albert Schoonover (1913–1917)
J. Robert O’Conner	(1917–1921)
Joseph C. Burke (1921–1925)
Samuel W. McNabb (1925–1933)
John Rose Laying (1933)
Peirson M. Hall (1933–1937)
Ben Harrison (1937–1940)
William Fleet Palmer (1940–1942)
Leo V. Silverstein (1942–943)
Charles H. Carr (1943–1946)
James M. Carter (1946–1949)
Ernest A. Tolin (1949–1951)
Walter Binns (1951–1953)
Laughlin Edward Waters Sr. (1953–1961)
Francis C. Whelan (1961–1964)
Thomas R. Sheridan (1962–1964)
Manuel L. Real (1964–1966)
John K. Van de Kamp (1966–1967)
William Matthew Byrne Jr. (1967–1970)
Robert L. Meyer (1970–1972) 
William D. Keller (1972–1977)
Robert L. Brosio (1977) (Acting)
Andrea S. Ordin (1977–1981)
Alexander H. Williams, III (1981) (Acting)
Stephen S. Trott (1981–1983)
Alexander H. Williams, III (1983–1984)
Robert C. Bonner (1984–1989)
Gary Allen Feess (1989)
Robert L. Brosio (1989–1990)
Lourdes Baird (1990–1992)
Terree Bowers (1992–1994)
Nora Margaret Manella (1994–1998)
Alejandro Mayorkas (1998–2001)
John S. Gordon (2001–2002)
Debra Wong Yang (2002–2006)
George S. Cardona (2006–2007)
Thomas P. O'Brien (2007–2009)
George S. Cardona (2009–2010) (Acting)
André Birotte Jr. (2010–2014)
Stephanie Yonekura (2014–2015) (Acting)
Eileen M. Decker (2015–2017)
Sandra R. Brown (2017–2018) (Acting)
Nicola T. Hanna (2018–2021)

See also 
 Courts of California
 List of current United States district judges
 List of United States federal courthouses in California

References

External links 
 United States District Court, Central District of California
 United States Attorney's Office, Central District of California

 
California, Central
California law
Government in Orange County, California
Government in Riverside County, California
Government in Riverside, California
Santa Ana, California
1966 establishments in California
Courts and tribunals established in 1966